Plasmodium bigueti is a parasite of the genus Plasmodium.

Like all Plasmodium species P. bigueti has both vertebrate and insect hosts. The vertebrate hosts for this parasite are birds.

Description 

The parasite was first described by Landau et al. in 2003.

Geographical occurrence 

This species was described in France.

Clinical features and host pathology 

The only known host is the sparrow (Passer domesticus).

References 

bigueti
Taxa named by Alain Chabaud